Entertainment Expo Hong Kong is an event held by the Hong Kong Trade Development Council. The following are part of the Entertainment Expo HK:
Hong Kong International Film & TV Market (FILMART)
Hong Kong-Asia Film Financing Forum (HAF)
Hong Kong Digital Entertainment Excellence Awards (HKDEEA)
Hong Kong International Film Festival (HKIFF)
Hong Kong Film Awards (HKFA)
IFPI Hong Kong Top Sales Music Award
Digital Entertainment Leadership Forum (DELF)
Hong Kong Independent Short Films and Video Awards (ifva)
It is sponsored by the Lan Kwai Fong Entertainments.

External links
Official website

Cinema of Hong Kong
Television in Hong Kong
Cantopop
Entertainment in Hong Kong